Capt. Eric Cato Nottingham  (9 May 1891 – 1972) was a British soldier and police officer who served as the Inspector General of Police of the Gold Coast Police Service from 8 October 1938 to 21 May 1944.

Nottingham was born in Streatham, London, in 1891. He received the Military Cross while serving in Belgium with the Royal Field Artillery in the First World War. Prior to his work in Ghana, he was the Assistant Commissioner of Police in the Northern Provinces, Nigeria.

He received the Colonial Police Medal in the 1941 New Year Honours.

Nottingham died in Eastbourne, Sussex, England, aged 80.

References

British police officers
Ghanaian Inspector Generals of Police
1891 births
1972 deaths
Recipients of the Military Cross
Recipients of the Colonial Police Medal
British Army personnel of World War I
Royal Field Artillery officers
British colonial police officers
British people in the British Gold Coast